Seelitz is an abandoned village in Brazeau Township in Perry County, Missouri, United States.

Name 

Seelitz was named after Seelitz in Saxony, Germany.

History 

Seelitz was a short-lived town near Altenburg, one of the seven colonies established in 1839 in the Saxon Migration. Pastor Ernst Moritz Bürger was the Lutheran pastor of the village. Seelitz was settled by people from Bürger's congregation in Germany and from that of his father. Although only one of the colonists is recorded as coming from the small parish of Seelitz, which is near Rochlitz in the Zwickauer Mulde valley, Bürger may have chosen it out of filial piety and the memory of his own first pastorate, rather than Lunzenau, from which he and most of his people had actually come. Seelitz must have been near to, and somewhere to the north of, Frohna, in the Brazeau Creek bottom, because the "special partition" between those two colonies had not yet been agreed upon in November, 1839. Seelitz' low-lying situation made it unhealthy and subject to various fevers. By 1841, Bürger's congregation had been reduced to five, and after much dissatisfaction he resigned, and the parish was made a branch of Altenburg. Thereafter the name disappears from the map. It has been impossible to ascertain whether its territory was united with that of Altenburg, or Frohna, or perchance changed its name to Brazeau, a small community which still survives a short distance away on Brazeau Creek, and which is said to have been originally settled by the Saxons in 1839.

References 

Abandoned villages in Perry County, Missouri